North Fork Elk River, or North Fork Elk Creek is a  tributary of the Elk River in Routt County, Colorado.  It flows from a source on the northeast slopes of Big Agnes Mountain in the Mount Zirkel Wilderness to a confluence  with the Middle Fork Elk River that forms the Elk River.

See also
 List of rivers of Colorado
 List of tributaries of the Colorado River

References

Rivers of Colorado
Rivers of Routt County, Colorado
Tributaries of the Colorado River in Colorado